16.6 (Before the Devil Knows You're Dead) is the eighth studio album by the German heavy metal band Primal Fear. It is the first album by the band not featuring long-time guitarist Stefan Leibing and the first album featuring new guitarist Magnus Karlsson, and the final album with guitarist Henny Wolter. The band says of the album that it "includes a lot of the vibe of our very first albums" and also "a lot of fresh and new elements".

A music video was made for "Six Times Dead (16.6)".

Track listing 
All songs written by Mat Sinner, Henry Wolter, Magnus Karlsson and Ralf Scheepers

Note
 An enhanced edition release contains the "Six Times Dead (16.6)" music video

Credits
Ralf Scheepers – vocals
Henny Wolter – guitars, vocals on "Hands of Time" 
Magnus Karlsson – guitars, vocals on "Hands of Time" 
Mat Sinner – bass guitar, backing vocals, vocals on "Hands of Time"
Randy Black – drums

Additional Musicians
Dennis Ward – backing vocals

Production
Ted Jensen – Mastering
Jack Breyer – Mixing (additional)
Mat Sinner – Producer
Sonja Müller – Mixing (additional)
Katja Piolka – Cover art, Photography
Achim "Akeem" Köhler – Mixing
Dennis Ward – Producer (additional), Engineering

References

2009 albums
Primal Fear (band) albums
Frontiers Records albums